Branded is the final studio album by the American soul musician Isaac Hayes. It was released in 1995 by Pointblank/Virgin/EMI Records.

Track listing
All tracks composed by Isaac Hayes; except where indicated

References

1995 albums
Isaac Hayes albums
albums produced by Isaac Hayes
Virgin Records albums